Anacampsis fullonella is a moth of the family Gelechiidae. It was described by Philipp Christoph Zeller in 1873. It is found in North America, where it has been recorded from Arkansas, Florida, Illinois, Kentucky, Louisiana, Mississippi, New Mexico, Oklahoma and Texas.

References

Moths described in 1873
Anacampsis
Moths of North America